Kataja is an islet south of Haparanda in Norrbotten. It is the easternmost point of Sweden and it is part of the Haparanda archipelago.

The name "Kataja" is Finnish for juniper.
The island is divided between Sweden and Finland. The border was established in 1809 between two islands, a larger Swedish one called Kataja and a smaller Finnish one called Inakari. In the years since then post-glacial rebound has caused the land in the region to rise relative to sea level, joining the two islands.
The border now crosses the southeastern part of the combined island, and is marked by two national cairns.
Kataja's beaches are mostly boulders with some sand. The eastern peninsula is covered in deciduous trees such as rowan, alder and willow, while the remainder is covered by coniferous trees.

See also
 Märket
 List of divided islands

References
Citations

Sources

Extreme points of Sweden
Swedish islands in the Baltic
Finnish islands in the Baltic
Uninhabited islands of Sweden
Uninhabited islands of Finland
Islands of Norrbotten County
International islands
Finland–Sweden border
Landforms of Lapland (Finland)